This is a list of notable footballers who have played for Rotherham United. The aim is for this list to include all players that have played 100 or more senior matches for the club. Other players who are deemed to have played an important role for the club can be included, but the reason for their notability should be included in the 'Notes' column.

The table should also include details of players who played for the two sides that merged to form United - Rotherham County and Rotherham Town.

For a list of all Rotherham United players with a Wikipedia article, see Category:Rotherham United F.C. players, and for the current squad see the main Rotherham United F.C. article.

Table

Players should be listed according to the year of their first team debut, and then by alphabetical order of their surname.

Appearances and goals should be for first-team competitive matches only, but excluding wartime matches. Substitute appearances should be included.

References 
 List of Rotherham United players since 1925, including total appearances/goals, and seasons they were at the club - at rotherhamunited1925.co.uk 
 Rotherham Post-war Football League Player statistics at Neil Brown site (up to 2013/14)
 
 List of Rotherham managers, and dates in charge - at Soccerbase
 Soccerbase stats (use Search for...on left menu and select 'Players' drop down) 

Rotherham United F.C.
 
Rotherham United F.C.
Association football player non-biographical articles